Bukhtnassar was the fourteenth Shirvanshah, ruling from 1049 to 1050. He was the successor and nephew of Qubad. In 1049, Bukhtnassar succeeded his uncle Qubad, but one year later he was deposed by his uncle, Sallar. Bukhtnassar managed to escape but was captured and executed by forces of Sallar near Baylaqan.

References

Sources 
 
 
 
 

11th-century rulers in Asia
11th-century Iranian people
1050 deaths